Empetrum nigrum, crowberry, black crowberry, or, in western Alaska, blackberry, is a flowering plant species in the heather family Ericaceae with a near circumboreal distribution in the Northern Hemisphere. It is usually dioecious, but there is a bisexual tetraploid subspecies, Empetrum nigrum subsp. hermaphroditum, which occurs in more northerly locations and at higher altitude.

Description
Empetrum nigrum is a low growing, evergreen shrub with a creeping habit. The stems are red when young and then fade to brown. It blooms between May and June. The flowers are small and not very noticeable, with greenish-pink sepals that turn reddish purple.

The metabolism and photosynthetic parameters of Empetrum can be altered in winter-warming experiments.

Subspecies
 Empetrum nigrum subsp. asiaticum (Nakai ex H.Ito) Kuvaev – Korean crowberry
 Empetrum nigrum subsp. subholarcticum (V.N.Vassil.) Kuvaev (synonym: Empetrum subholarcticum V.N.Vassil.)

Distribution and habitat
The species has a near circumboreal distribution in the Northern Hemisphere. It is also native in the Falkland Islands.

Evolutionary biologists have explained the striking geographic distribution of crowberries as a result of long-distance migratory birds dispersing seeds from one pole to the other.

Empetrum nigrum grows in acidic soils in shady, moist areas.

Ecology
The plant is a food source of several moths, including the Black Mountain, Mountain Burnet and Broad-bordered White Underwing.

Uses
The fruit is edible and can be dried. However, it has an acidic taste and can cause headaches. While abundant in Scandinavia, it is treasured for its ability to make good wine, juices, or jelly. In subarctic areas, the plant has been a vital addition to the diet of the Inuit and the Sami. The Dena'ina (Tanaina) harvest it for food, sometimes storing in quantity for winter, and like it mixed with lard or oil.

The species can also be grown as a ground cover, or as an ornamental plant in rock gardens, notably the yellow-foliaged cultivar 'Lucia'. The fruit is high in anthocyanin pigment and can be used to make a natural food dye.

Culture 
The Scottish Highlands Clan Maclean's badge is believed to be E. nigrum; cuttings of it would be raised on standards to denote clan identity and allegiance.

References

Forest Service Fire Ecology

nigrum
Plants described in 1753
Greenlandic cuisine
Flora of Subarctic America
Taxa named by Carl Linnaeus